Corralillo is a municipality and town in the Villa Clara Province of Cuba. It was founded in 1831 and established as a municipality in 1879.

Geography
Corralillo is located on the northern coast of Cuba, in the north-western corner of the Villa Clara province, bordering the Matanzas Province to the west and the Bay of Cadiz to the north. The cays of Falcones, Blanquizal and Verde of the Sabana-Camagüey Archipelago as well as a multitude of reefs are located at sea north of Corralillo.

The municipality is divided into the consejos populares (mainly villages) of Ceja de Pablo, Corralillo (municipal seat), Palma Sola, Perú, Rancho Veloz, Sabana Grande, Santa María and Sierra Morena.

Demographics
In 2004, the municipality of Corralillo had a population of 27,581.

Institutions 

 Library "Rafael Izquierdo Triana"
 Cultural center “Leopoldo Romañach”
 Movie theater Jigüe
 Municipal Directorate of Culture of Corralillo
 Bookstore “Esperanza Ruiz”
 Corralillo Municipal Museum

See also
Municipalities of Cuba
List of cities in Cuba

References

External links

Populated places in Villa Clara Province
Populated places established in 1831
1831 establishments in North America
1831 establishments in the Spanish Empire